Al-Wustho Mangkunegaran Mosque is a historic mosque located in the Central Javanese city of Surakarta, to the west of the Mangkunegaran Palace. The mosque is one of the three oldest mosques of Surakarta. Al-Wustho Mangkunegaran Mosque was inaugurated as a state mosque ("masjid nagara") of the Mangkunegaran Palace.

History
The mosque was formerly known as Mangkunegaran Mosque. Construction started in 1878 and the building was completed in 1918, with several parts of the building renovated by Thomas Karsten. Maintenance of the mosque was taken care by the royal courtier (abdi dalem) of the Mangkunegaran Palace.

The title Al-Wustho was given for the first time in 1949 by the chief (kepala takmir) of the Mangkunegaran Palace Imam Rosidi. Al-Wustho means "average", which refers to the average size of the Mangkunegaran Mosque, not as large as the Great Mosque of Surakarta but not as small as the Kepatihan Mosque.

Architecture

Al-Wustho Mangkunegaran Mosque is designed in a typical Javanese architecture for religious buildings. Like most mosques in Javanese tradition, it features a tajug (pyramid)-styled roof, a traditional roof form that is only reserved for religious building e.g. mosques or temple. The roof contains three tiers and is topped with a mustaka top finial decoration. The roof is supported by four saka guru main posts and twelve supporting posts saka rawa. The saka guru is decorated with Arabic calligraphy at the base. 

The  features a large  named Kanjeng Kyai Danaswara. To the south of the main hall is an expansion in the form of a covered porch. The covered porch is used as a prayer hall for women.

Similar to the Great Mosque of Surakarta, the front porch features the markis, a kind of portal structure decorated with Arabic calligraphy. The portal is inspired by the Indonesian archaic form of paduraksa, a portal marking the holiest site in a religious building compound.

This minaret is situated to the northeast of the main building. The minaret was built in 1926.

The  is where the circumcision ritual can be practiced. The  was originally built by Mangkunegara V for the circumcision of the royal family of the Mangkunegara court. During the reign of Mangkunegara VII in the early 20th-century, the general public is finally allowed to perform circumcision inside , performed by the Muhammadiyah.

References

Citations

Cited sources

See also

List of mosques in Indonesia
Indonesian Islamic architecture

Mosques in Surakarta
Mosques completed in 1918
20th-century mosques